Telemark District Court is a district court located in Vestfold og Telemark county, Norway. This court is based at three different courthouses which are located in Skien, Notodden, and Kviteseid. The court serves the western part of the county which includes 17 municipalities. The court in Skien accepts cases from the municipalities of Bamble, Drangedal, Kragerø, Nome, Porsgrunn, Siljan, and Skien. The court in Kviteseid accepts cases from the municipalities of Fyresdal, Kviteseid, Nissedal, Tokke, Seljord, and Vinje. The court in Notodden accepts cases from the municipalities of Hjartdal, Notodden, Tinn, and Midt-Telemark. The court is subordinate to the Agder Court of Appeal.

The court is led by a chief judge and several other judges. The court is a court of first instance. Its judicial duties are mainly to settle criminal cases and to resolve civil litigation as well as bankruptcy. The administration and registration tasks of the court include death registration, issuing certain certificates, performing duties of a notary public, and officiating civil wedding ceremonies. Cases from this court are heard by a combination of professional judges and lay judges.

History
This court was established on 26 April 2021 after the old Aust-Telemark District Court, Nedre Telemark District Court, and Vest-Telemark District Court were all merged into one court. The new district court system continues to use the courthouses from the predecessor courts.

References

District courts of Norway
2021 establishments in Norway
Organisations based in Skien
Organisations based in Notodden
Organisations based in Kviteseid